Kuzhur is a small village in the southern end of Thrissur district of the Indian province of Kerala. The old Jewish settlement of Mala is the nearest town.

Description
Kuzhur is set amid cultivated paddy fields. The Chalakkudy River flows on the southern end of Kuzhur.

The village has several temples. Kuzhur Sri Subrahmanya Swami temple is major pilgrim centre for Hindu devotees. It comes under the Cochin Devaswom Board and is noted for its architecture as well as its importance for Hindu devotees. The height of Lord Sri Subrahmanya is more than 6 feet is mostly attracted by the devotees.  Temple having Utsavam for 8 days in Vruschikam and Kuzhur Ekadasi is the most important day of Utsavam (Valiya Vilakku).  Several programmes conducting during these Utsavam days in Kuzhur. Thula Shashti in Thulam and THAIPOOYAM in Makaram. The temple constructed by Perumal.

Kuzhur belongs to Mukundapuram Taluk of Thrissur District.  The old villages of Kuzhur were Thirumukkulam and Kakkulissery.  Famous Iranikulam Siva Temple is 2 km from Kuzhur.  Tholan (believed to have been the first Namboothiri poet of Malayalam), believed to have visited/lived in Iranikulam.

Education 

 Govt. HS, Kuzhur
 Govt. HSS, Iranikulam
 St. Antony's Girls HS, South Thanissery
 Govt. UPS, Kundur
 St. Xavier's LPS, South Thanissery
 SKV LPS, Eravathur

Culture
The eight-day-long Kuzhur Ekadasi Festival is held annually in the village. Ritual drum performances, known as "chendamelams", and panchavadhyam are performed on the festive days, and there is a procession of 15 elephants.

Sports 
Kuzhur has a mini panjayath stadium.

KBFC (Kacheri Brothers Football Club) is the local football club. The club's glory days coincided with the years when Kerala football team was one of the best in India. The club still plays in local tournaments and conducts an annual football tournament.

Business & Retails shops
Home Style, Fancy, School stationery, Gifts, Household & Toys Centre, Kuzhur Jn
New Style, Household & Perfume (Shivoham agarbatti Manufactures) Manufactures In Kerala, A highly demand premium quality sticks manufactures.
Tharunya Textiles (താരുണ്യ ടെക്സ്റ്റ്‌ടൈൽസ് ) Kuzhoor.

Industry & Manufacturing Units
Shivoham agarbatti Factory, Near Valiyoliparambil Bahagavathy Temple, A reputed Manufacturer, Supplier, Exporter and Trader of Agarbatti & Dhoop Batthi company in Kerala.

Image gallery

References 
 

http://lsgkerala.in/kuzhurpanchayat/

Villages in Thrissur district